Joel Ostrowski (born 5 August 1975 in Copenhagen, Denmark) is a Danish curler and curling coach.

At the national level, he is a three-time Danish men's champion curler (2002, 2003, 2006) and a three-time Danish mixed champion curler (2008, 2009, 2012).

Teams

Men's

Mixed

Record as a coach of national teams

References

External links

Living people
1975 births
Sportspeople from Copenhagen
Danish male curlers
Danish curling champions
Danish curling coaches